Grant Andrew Long (born March 12, 1966) is an American former professional basketball player.  He played over 1,000 games for the National Basketball Association over a 15-year career.  Long had two relatives who were playing in the NBA during his tenure in the league: his uncle John Long, and his cousin Terry Mills.  His brother is professional boxer Julius Long.

Broadcasting career
Having served as the broadcast analyst for the Oklahoma City Thunder since 2008, Long resigned from the position in July 2014. In October 2014 Long joined Fox Sports Detroit as a Detroit Pistons analyst and sideline reporter.

Notes

External links
 Career Stats

1966 births
Living people
African-American basketball players
American expatriate basketball people in Canada
American men's basketball players
Atlanta Hawks players
Basketball players from Michigan
Boston Celtics players
Detroit Pistons announcers
Detroit Pistons players
Eastern Michigan Eagles men's basketball players
Memphis Grizzlies players
Miami Heat draft picks
Miami Heat players
Oklahoma City Thunder announcers
People from Wayne, Michigan
Power forwards (basketball)
Vancouver Grizzlies players
Romulus Senior High School alumni
21st-century African-American people
20th-century African-American sportspeople